Isiaha Mike (born August 11, 1997) is a Canadian professional basketball player for JL Bourg of the French LNB Pro A. He played college basketball for the Duquesne Dukes and the SMU Mustangs.

Early life and high school career
Mike grew up in Scarborough, Toronto. As a middle schooler, Mike stood 6'5 and spent much time in the gymnasium to compensate for his lack of basketball skills. He played pick-up basketball in middle school but switched his focus to academics while attending West Hill Collegiate Institute in Scarborough, Toronto. Mike played for Hoops Canada Elite on the Amateur Athletic Union (AAU) circuit. In August 2014, he won most valuable player of the Americas Team Camp. He later transferred to Trinity International School in Las Vegas, Nevada under head coach Greg Lockridge. He averaged 27.6 points, 14.3 rebounds, 3.1 assists and 1.9 steals per game as a senior. He led his team to a second straight National Christian School Athletic Association title game and was named to the All-Tournament Team. Mike played in the BioSteel All-Canadian Game in April 2016. North Pole Hoops ranked him the third-best Canadian player in the 2016 class behind Thon Maker and Justin Jackson.

College career
Mike played for Duquesne in his freshman season. He averaged 11.3 points and 5.8 rebounds per game and was named to the Atlantic 10 All-Rookie Team. After the season, he was granted a release from the program following the departure of head coach Jim Ferry. Mike transferred to SMU during his official visit, turning down an offer from Oregon. He sat out one season due to National Collegiate Athletic Association transfer rules and was a member of the scout team during practice. At first, Mike was frustrated with his role, arguing with the coaching staff, but matured with the help of his teammate Jarrey Foster. On January 30, 2019, he scored a career-high 25 points and grabbed seven rebounds in an 85–83 loss to Wichita State. Mike finished the season averaging 11.7 points, 5.4 rebounds, 1.7 assists and 1.1 blocks per game. As a junior, Mike matched his career-high of 25 points, all of which came after the first half, and grabbed 12 rebounds in an 87–85 double overtime loss to Georgia on December 20. In his junior season, he averaged 14 points, 6.3 rebounds, 1.8 assists and 1.4 steals per game and was named to the Third Team All-American Athletic Conference. Mike announced that he would remain in the 2020 NBA draft and forgo his senior season.

Professional career
On August 31, 2020, Mike signed his first professional contract with Niners Chemnitz of the German Basketball Bundesliga. He averaged 10.5 points and 5.2 rebounds per game. On July 3, 2021, Mike re-signed with the team.

On May 29, 2022, Mike signed with the Scarborough Shooting Stars of the CEBL.

On June 30, 2022, Mike signed with JL Bourg of the French LNB Pro A.

Career statistics

College

|-
| style="text-align:left;"| 2016–17
| style="text-align:left;"| Duquesne
| 32 || 32 || 28.4 || .434 || .333 || .667 || 5.8 || 1.6 || .8 || .8 || 11.3
|-
| style="text-align:left;"| 2017–18
| style="text-align:left;"| SMU
| style="text-align:center;" colspan="11"|  Redshirt
|-
| style="text-align:left;"| 2018–19
| style="text-align:left;"| SMU
| 32 || 32 || 30.7 || .453 || .368 || .763 || 5.4 || 1.7 || .9 || 1.1 || 11.7
|-
| style="text-align:left;"| 2019–20
| style="text-align:left;"| SMU
| 30 || 30 || 30.7 || .481 || .377 || .805 || 6.3 || 1.8 || 1.4 || .6 || 14.0
|- class="sortbottom"
| style="text-align:center;" colspan="2"| Career
| 94 || 94 || 29.9 || .456 || .361 || .746 || 5.8 || 1.7 || 1.0 || .9 || 12.3

References

External links
SMU Mustangs bio
Duquesne Dukes bio

1997 births
Living people
Basketball players from Toronto
Canadian men's basketball players
Canadian expatriate basketball people in Germany
Canadian expatriate basketball people in the United States
Duquesne Dukes men's basketball players
JL Bourg-en-Bresse players
NINERS Chemnitz players
Scarborough Shooting Stars players
SMU Mustangs men's basketball players